Kwanchai Fuangprakob (born May 28, 1978) or the nickname "Dum" is a Thai former footballer and Thailand national team in 1999-2007. He primary plays as a striker and scored 2 goals for the national team and the nickname which is Romario of Thailand happened.

Honours

2005 Thailand Premier League Winner with Thailand Tobacco Monopoly

International goals

References 

1978 births
Living people
Kwanchai Fuangprakob
Kwanchai Fuangprakob
Kwanchai Fuangprakob
Kwanchai Fuangprakob
Kwanchai Fuangprakob
Kwanchai Fuangprakob
Kwanchai Fuangprakob
Association football forwards